Loud Guitars, Big Suspicions is the debut album by American blues-rock artist Shannon Curfman, released in 1999, for Arista Records when she was 14 years old.

Track listing
"Few and Far Between" (Kevin Bowe, Shannon Curfman) – 3:54
"No Riders" (Bowe, Curfman) – 3:29
"True Friends" (Bruce McCabe) – 3:29
"If You Change Your Mind" (Bowe, Curfman, David Grissom) – 4:25
"Love Me Like That" (Bowe, Curfman, Jonny Lang) – 3:22
"Playing with Fire" (Curfman, Gordon Kennedy, Wayne Kirkpatrick, Tommy Sims) – 4:56
"I Don't Make Promises (I Can't Break)" (Bowe, Kostas) – 3:48
"Hard to Make a Stand" (Bill Bottrell, Scott Bryan, Sheryl Crow, Todd Wolfe) – 4:01
"The Weight" (Robbie Robertson) – 5:26
"Never Enough" (Bowe, Curfman) – 3:47
"I'm Coming Home" (Bowe, Curfman, McCabe) – 3:12

References

Shannon Curfman albums
1999 debut albums
Arista Records albums